Girardinus falcatus, the goldbelly topminnow, is a species of Cuban tropical fish. Another common name of the species is yellow belly. The fish is pale gold and has a bright blue iris. Males are smaller than females and constantly mate.

References

Tropical fish
falcatus
Fish described in 1903
Taxa named by Carl H. Eigenmann
Freshwater fish of Cuba
Endemic fauna of Cuba